Wavelength is a 1983 science fiction film written and directed by Mike Gray and starring Robert Carradine, Cherie Currie, and Keenan Wynn.

Plot

Bobby Sinclaire (Robert Carradine), a failing Californian musician, meets telepathic Iris Longacre (Cherie Currie) in a bar and they begin a relationship. At Sinclaire's apartment, Longacre begins to hear things others cannot. The young couple discover the voices are from a childlike race of aliens being held by the U.S. government after their UFO crashed. The government plans to use the trio of aliens for experimentation and dissection  in a supposedly abandoned underground bunker located near Sinclaire's apartment. The couple decides to liberate the aliens and help them return them to their mothership.

Reception

TV Guide gave the movie two out of five stars, praising the movie's sense of morality and soundtrack, but found Carradine's performance lacking during the music scenes and the narration at the beginning and ending of the film to be very detrimental to the movie. Moria found that the movie has a promising build up,  but that the film heads in predictable directions, and that its special effects were lacking. Creature Feature found that the movie was an interesting morality tale, and also praised the soundtrack, but said that the use of children to play the aliens hampered the film.

Production

It was planned for the movie to be released before E.T. the Extra-Terrestrial, but implementation of the film's special effects delayed its release. A later 1984 film release called Starman was accused of plagiarising Wavelength.

Soundtrack

Wavelength (1983) is the twentieth major release and third soundtrack album by the German band Tangerine Dream. It is the soundtrack for the film Wavelength starring Robert Carradine, Cherie Currie, and Keenan Wynn.

Many of the tracks are remixes from other albums:
 "Desert Drive" and "Spaceship" are remixed excerpts from "Quichotte, Part One" from Quichotte.
 "Healing is a remixed excerpt of "Tangram Set One" from Tangram
 "Breakout" is a remixed version of "Vitamin C" from the Edgar Froese soundtrack to the film Kamikaze 1989.
 "Church Theme" is a remix of "Silver Scale"; a song that was performed live during European tours in 1980 and 1981, but not released by that name until 1994 on Tangents.
 "Sunset Drive" is a remix of "Remote Viewing" from Exit.
"Alley Walk" contains elements related to the 1983 single "Moorland" taken from the German TV series Tatort.
"Alien Voices" and "Wavelength Main Title" were used in the intro of the 1988 Colombian series called "El Visitante"

See also
List of films featuring extraterrestrials

References

External links

1983 films
American independent films
1980s science fiction films
Films scored by Tangerine Dream
1983 independent films
American science fiction films
New World Pictures films
1980s English-language films
1980s American films